The M4V file format is a video container format developed by Apple and is very similar to the MP4 format. The primary difference is that M4V files may optionally be protected by DRM copy protection.

Apple uses M4V to encode video files in its iTunes Store. Unauthorized reproduction of M4V files may be prevented using Apple's FairPlay copy protection. A FairPlay-protected M4V file can only be played on a computer authorized (using iTunes) with the account that was used to purchase the video.  In QuickTime, M4V videos using FairPlay DRM are identified as "AVC0 Media".

Besides Apple iTunes and the Apple QuickTime Player, M4V files can also be opened and played with Media Player Classic, K-Multimedia Player, RealPlayer, Zoom Player, VLC media player, MPlayer, DivX Plus Player, and Nero Showtime (included with Nero Multimedia Suite). The format without DRM can also be played in the webOS Video Player for use on the Palm Pre, Palm Pixi smartphones. It is also playable by the Android operating system with its video player. It is used as the default video conversion format for HandBrake and Air Video Server on the Macintosh. Some other video players can also recognize and play M4V files if the file extension is changed from ".m4v" to ".mp4".

HandBrake-produced M4V files can also be played on the PlayStation 3, with full Dolby Digital 5.1 surround support.

See also
MP4 (MPEG-4 Part 14)
Container format (digital) definition and article
Comparison of (audio/video) container formats
List of multimedia (audio/video) codecs
List of open-source codecs
Comparison of video codecs
Comparison of audio coding formats

References

Apple Inc. software
Digital container formats
MPEG